Glossodoris katoi is a species of sea slug, a dorid nudibranch, a shell-less marine gastropod mollusk in the family Chromodorididae.

Distribution 
The type locality for this species is Izu Peninsula, Middle Japan.

References

Chromodorididae
Gastropods described in 1938